Elections to the Manipur Legislative Assembly were held in February 1967 to elect members of the 30 constituencies in Manipur, India. The Indian National Congress won the most seats and its leader, Mairembam Koireng Singh was appointed as the Chief Minister of Manipur for his second term.

Background 
After the passing of the States Reorganisation Act, 1956 and the Constitution (Seventh Amendment) Act, 1956, Manipur was converted from a Part-C state to a Union Territory but, it wasn't assigned a Legislative Assembly. Later, after the passing of The Government of Union Territories Act, 1963, Manipur was assigned a Legislative Assembly of 30 members. A delimitation commission was set up which included the members of the Lok Sabha who were representing Manipur at the time.

Result

Elected members

See also 
 List of constituencies of the Manipur Legislative Assembly
 1967 elections in India

References

Manipur
1967
1967